Émile Ignat (21 March 1908 – 28 June 1981) was a French racing cyclist. He rode in the 1933 Tour de France.

References

External links
 

1908 births
1981 deaths
French male cyclists